Sheela Ravichandran (Born 22 March 1945) is an Indian actress and director who appears predominantly in Malayalam cinema. Paired with Prem Nazir, they hold the Guinness World Record for acting in the largest number of films (130) together as heroine and hero. Sheela is a four-time winner of Kerala State Film Award. She came back to acting in 2003 through Manassinakkare after a long period of 22 years. In 2005, she won the National Film Award for Best Supporting Actress for her role in the Malayalam film Akale. In 2019, Sheela was honoured with the J C Daniel Award, the Kerala government's highest honour for outstanding contribution to Malayalam cinema. She was also one of the highest paid actresses, reportedly paid more than her male counterparts, of her time.

Early life and family
Sheela was born in a Syrian Christian family to Railway officer Kanimangalam Antony and Gracy  at Thrissur, Kingdom of Cochin (now Kerala). She was brought up in Ooty. Her early name was Celine. Since her father was working with the railways, she was brought up in different places before finally settling down at Chennai. As a result, she had her primary education at various places, including Trivandrum, Thrissur, Ooty, Tiruchirappalli, Salem, Edappally and St. Francis Anglo-Indian Girls School, Coimbatore.

She was initially married to Xavier, a reporter, which ended in a divorce.

Film career
Sheela was introduced to theatre at the age of 13 by Tamil actor S. S. Rajendran, he offered her a job in S.S.R Nataka Mandram. She was introduced into the film industry at the age of 17 by MGR in the Tamil film Paasam (1962). M. G. Ramachandran, the hero of the film, added the suffix "Devi" to her name, thus he renamed her "Sheela Devi". She would continue to act in Tamil films with that name. Later, she reverted her name to Sheela, her original name. The same year, she made her Malayalam debut through Bhagyajathakam. The next two decades saw her act in more than 475 films in various languages such as Malayalam, Tamil, Telugu, Kannada, Hindi, and Urdu. Her popular films are  Chemmeen, Kallichellamma, Velutha Kathreena Akale, Oru Penninte Kadha, Sarsaiya, Yakshaganam, Kutti Kuppayam, Sthanarthy Saramma, Kadathunattu Makkan, Kannapan Unni, Jwala, Vazhve Mayam, etc. In Kannapanunni, she plays the role of a powerful yet humane princess forced to marry a poor woodcutter. In Kadathanattu Makkam, she plays the role of a princess who is cheated by her sisters-in-law and false allegations of being in love with a boatman are leveled against her. She and the boatman are both given the death sentence.

In the 1970s and 1980s, she directed two films Yakshaganom and Shikarangal. She wrote the story and screenplay for Shikharangaland Yakshagaanam, which was also remade in Tamil. Sheela wrote the story and screenplay for Mammooty starrer Onnu Chiriku.  Besides films, she has directed a tele-film titled Ninaivukale Neengividu, co-starring Jayabharathi. Her other films include Vishnu Vijayam and Eeta. She retired from the film industry in the 1983 and settled at Ootacamund, Tamil Nadu. After a long sabbatical, she returned to acting, playing a role in Sathyan Anthikkad's Manassinakkare (2003). The same year, she acted in the Tamil film Chandramukhi.

Sheela, along with Prem Nazir, holds the Guinness World Record for acting in the largest number of films (130) together. In 2005, she won the National Film Award for Best Supporting Actress and Kerala State Film Award for Second Best Actress for her role in the Malayalam film Akale. She received the Kerala State Film Award for Best Actress thrice in her film career in 1969, 1971, and 1976. She has won awards such as Kerala State Film Awards, the Lux award, and the Filmfare Lifetime Achievement award. Sheela made an exhibition of her paintings at hotel Le- Meridian in Ernakulam and 93 paintings were sold, most of which were bought by Snehatheeram Baby Mathew and Ravi Pillai. The amount collected from these paintings was donated as a flood relief fund for the people in Chennai.

Awards
National Film Awards
 2005 Best Supporting Actress – Akale

Kerala State Film Awards
 1969 – Kerala State Film Award for Best Actress for Kallichellamma
 1971 – Kerala State Film Award for Best Actress for Oru Penninte Kadha, Sarassayya, Ummachu
 1976 – Kerala State Film Award for Best Actress for Anubhavam
 2004 – Second Best Actress for Akale

Filmfare Awards South
 1977 – Best Malayalam Actress – Lakshmi
 2000 – Filmfare Lifetime Achievement Award – South
South Indian International Movie Awards
 2021 – Lifetime Achievement Award

Asianet Film Awards
 2007 – Best Lifetime Achievement Award

Other Awards
2007 Lux Lifetime Achievement Award
2006 Amrita TV Lifetime Achievement Award
 2019 J. C. Daniel Award
 2019 Jayan Ragamalika Award
 2020 Malayala Puraskaram

Filmography

Actress

Malayalam

2022 - Anuragam
 2021 - Ammachikoottile Pranayakalam as Rosamma
 2019 - A for Apple as Lekshmy
 2019 - Thanka Bhasma Kuriyitta Thamburatty as herself (Archive footage/Uncredited cameo)
 2017 – Basheerinte Premalekhanam as Ummuma
 2014 – Ulsaha Committee as Rosemary
 2012 – Mr. Marumakan as Raja Kokila
 2012 - Lumiere Brothers as herself (Archive footage/Uncredited cameo)
 2011 – Kottarathil Kutty Bhootham as Grandma
 2011 – Snehaveedu as Ammukutty Amma
 2011 – Naayika as herself (Archive footage/Uncredited cameo)
 2008 - Twenty:20 as herself (Archive footage/Uncredited cameo)
 2006 – Pathaka as Elizabeth Mamman
 2005 – Ponmudipuzhayorathu as Subhadramma
 2005 – Thaskara Veeran as Meenakhsi
 2004 – Akale as Margaret D'Costa
 2003 – Manassinakkare as Kochu Thresia
 1982 – Aasha
 1982 – Madrasile Mon
 1982 - Sahyante Makan
 1981 – Thalam Manasinte Thalam
 1981 – Thakilu Kottampuram as Mridula
 1981 – Sphodanam as Devaki
 1981 – Urukku Mushttikal
 1981 – Adimachangala
 1980 - Pappu as herself
 1980 – Akalangalil Abhayam
 1980 – Ithile Vannavar as Devi Menon
 1980 – Nattuchakkiruttu
 1980 – Kalika as Kalika
 1980 – Avan Oru Ahankari
 1980 – Theenalangal as Devamma/Leelamma
 1979 – Yakshiparu as Paru
 1979 – Pichathikuttappan
 1979 – Sikharangal as Savithri
 1979 – Pathivrutha
 1979 – Sarapancharam as Soudamini
 1979 – Avesham as Susheela
 1978 – Ahalya
 1978 – Vilakkum Velichavum
 1978 – Kadathanattu Makkam as Makkam
 1978 – Etho Oru Swapnam as Kousalya
 1978 – Kanyaka as Geetha
 1978 – Tiger Salim
 1978 – Anappachan as Sundari
 1978 – Itha Oru Manushyan as Radha
 1978 – Amarsham
 1978 – Jayikkanayi Janichavan as Lakshmi
 1978 – Eeta as Annamma
 1978 – Jalatharangam as Lakshmi
 1978 – Bharyayum Kamukiyum
 1977 – Aval Oru Devalayam as Jameela
 1977 – Neethipeedam
 1977 – Ivanente Priyaputhran
 1977 – Mohavum Mukthiyum
 1977 – Innale Innu as Thulasi
 1977 – Niraparayum Nilavilakkum
 1977 – Aparadhi as Susheela
 1977 – Yatheem as Kunjivarachi
 1977 – Poojakedukatha Pookkal as Sharada
 1977 – Kavilamma
 1977 – Lakshmi
 1977 – Veedoru Swargam
 1977 – Aa Nimisham
 1977 – Aashirvadam
 1977 – Acharam Ammini Osharam Omana... Omana, Ammini (double role)
 1977 – Samudram as  Omana
 1977 – Kannappanunni as Ponni
 1976 – Romeo
 1976 – Yakshagaanam as Savithri
 1976 – Mallanum Mathevanum
 1976 – Rajankanam
 1976 – Anubhavam as Valsala
 1976 – Palkadal as Gouri
 1975 – Ulasayathra
 1975 – Mattoru Seetha as Seetha's sister
 1975 – Odakuzhal
 1975 – Omanakunju as Gouri
 1975 – Athithi as Ramani
 1974 – Aswathy 
 1974 – Vishnuvijayam as Leela
 1974 – Shapamoksham
 1974 – Manyashree Vishvamithran as Kusumam
 1974 – Thumbolarcha as Thumbolarcha
 1974 – Jeevikkan Marannu Poya Sthree
 1973 – Chaayam
 1973 – Kaapalika as Rosamma/Kaapalika
 1973 – Chukku as Molly
 1973 – Ithu Manushyanano
 1972 – Devi
 1972 – Manushya Bandangal as Sudha
 1972 – Aromalunni as Maakkam
 1972 – Puthrakameshti as Rupa
 1972 – Anandashayanam
 1972 – Nadan Premam as Malu
 1972 – Aradimanite Janmi as Dr.Jayanthy
 1972 – Preethi
 1972 – Sakthi
 1972 – Baalya Prathinja as Kusuma
 1972 – Omana as Omana
 1971 – Avalalppam Vaikipoyi
 1971 – Kalithozhi as Ammini
 1971 – Thapaswini
 1971 – Vithukal as Sarojini
 1971 – Agnimrugam as Bhanumathi
 1971 – Karinizhal as Malathy/Baby
 1971 – Makane Ninaku Vendi as Chinnamma
 1971 – Oru Penninte Kadha as Savithri/Gayathridevi
 1971 – Muthassi as Susi/Geetha
 1971 – Shiksha as Shobha
 1971 – Moonnupookkal as Shobha
 1971 – Panchavankaadu as Kochu Thankachi
 1971 – Inquilab Sindabad as Rajamma
 1971 – Anubhavangal Paalichakal as Bhavani
 1971 – Sarasayya as Sarojam
 1971 – Sumangali as Vasanthy
 1971 – Puthenveedu
 1971 – Thettu as Baby
 1971 – Ummachu as Ummachu
 1971 – Vivaha Sammanam as Gourikutty
 1970 – Palunku Pathram
 1970 – Anadha as Radha
 1970 – Moodalmanju as Geetha, Usha
 1970 – Kalpana as Sushamma, Susheela, Kalpana
 1970 – Nazhikakallu
 1970 – Aa Chithrashalabam Paranotte as Indira
 1970 – Ningalenne Communistakki as Sumam
 1970 – Nizhalattam as Shantha
 1970 – Ezhuthatha Kadha as Kayamkulam Kamalamma
 1970 – Othenante Makan as Unnimaathu
 1970 – Abhayam as Sethulakshmi
 1970 – Bheekara Nimishangal as Savithri 
 1970 – Dathuputhran as Gracy
 1970 – Lottery Ticket as Malathy
 1970 – Mindapennu as Kamalam
 1970 – Ambalapravu as Sharadha
 1970 – Aranazhika Neram as Shanthamma
 1970 – Vivaham Swargathil
 1970 – Kurukshethram as Sethulakshmi
 1970 – Vazhve Mayam as Sarala, Sarala's daughter (double role)
 1969 – Danger Biscuit as Aswathy
 1969 – Rahsayam as Ammini
 1969 – Pooja Pushppam
 1969 – Kuruthikalam
 1969 – Jwala as Rajamma
 1969 – Kannur Deluxe as Jayasree
 1969 – Aalmaram as Kusumam
 1969 – Koottukudumbam as Thankamma
 1969 – Rest House as Leela
 1969 – Mister Kerala
 1969 – Adimakal as Saraswathiyamma
 1969 – Kadalpalam as Sarala
 1969 – Virunnukari as Radha
 1969 – Kallichellamma as Chellamma
 1968 – Thirichadi as Ramani
 1968 – Anachadanam
 1968 – Bharyamar Sookshikkuka as Shobha
 1968 – Lakshaprabhu
 1968 – Kayalkarayil
 1968 – Vidhyarthi
 1968 – Velutha Kathreena as Kathreena
 1968 – Padunna Puzha as Rajalakshmi
 1968 – Love in Kerala as Mala
 1968 – Punnapra Vayalar as Chellamma
 1968 – Agnipareeksha as Hema
 1968 – Thulabaram as Valsala
 1967 – Kudumbam as  Nirmala
 1967 – Ashwamedham as Sarojam
 1967 – Nadan Pennu as Achamma
 1967 – Olathumathi
 1967 – Pooja as Anandam
 1967 – Ramanan as Chandrika
 1967 – Balyakalasakhi as Suhara
 1967 – Agniputhri as Sindhu
 1967 – Chithramela
 1967 – Pathirapattu as Soldier's wife
 1967 – Kottayam Kolacase
 1967 – Swapnabhoomi as Sreedevi
 1967 – Cochin Express as Geetha
 1967 – Mainatheruvi Kolacase as Marykutti
 1967 – Khadeeja
 1967 – Kanatha Veshangal
 1967 – Collector Malathi as Malathy
 1967 – Lady Doctor as Lilly
 1966 – Koottukar as Radha
 1966 – Kalithozhan as Radha
 1966 – Sthanarthi Saramma as Saramma
 1966 – Kanakachilanka
 1966 – Tharavattamma as Radha
 1966 – Priyathama
 1966 - Penmakkal as Padma
 1966 - Rowdy as Devayani
 1965 – Pattuthuvala as Celine
 1965 – Kathirunna Nikkah as Laila
 1965 – Kadathukaran as Madhuri
 1965 – Daaham as Latha
 1965 – Chemmeen as Karuthamma
 1965 – Muthalali as Devaki
 1965 – Jeevitha Yaathra as Radha
 1965 – Thommante Makkal as Marykutty
 1965 – Mayavi as Vasanthy
 1965 – Porter Kunjali as Aamina
 1965 – Kavyamela as Sreedevi
 1965 – Thankakudam as Kabir's wife
 1964 – Oral Koodi Kallanayi as Ayisha
 1964 – Kudumbini as Jaanu
 1964 – Bharthavu as Sumathi
 1964 – Karutha Kai as Latha
 1964 – Kuttikuppayam as Safiya
 1964 – Althara as Rebecca
 1964 – Aayisha as Amina
 1963 – Moodupadam as Ammukutty
 1963 – Susheela as Hema
 1963 – Doctor as Jayasree
 1963 – Ninamaninja Kalpadukal as Ammini
 1963 – Kattumaina as Neeli
 1962 – Bagyajathakam as Radha

Tamil

 Marravan (2016) as Velambal 
 Palakkattu Madhavan (2015) as Pattu Maami
 Seedan (2011) as Amritavalli
 Veeranna (2005) as Rajeshwari
 Chandramukhi (2005) as Akhilandeswari
 Bombay (1995)
 Sendhoora Devi (1991)
 Amma Appa (1974)
 Manjal Kungumam (1973) as Subhadra
 Pennai Vazha Vidungal (1969) as Shanathi
 Odum Nadhi (1969) as Maya
 Moondrezhuthu (1968) as Suguna
 Sathyam Thavaradhey (1968) as Leela
 Pudhiya Bhoomi (1968) as Nalina
 Paal Manam (1968)
 Gowri Kalyanam (1966) as Lakshmi
 Vallavan Oruvan (1966) as Susi
 Lorry Driver (1966)
 Idhayak Kamalam (1965) as Seetha
 Kaattu Ranni (1965) as Meena
 Iravum Pagalum (1965)
 Karuppu Panam (1964) as Luci
 Chitrangi (1964)
 Karpagam (1963) as Pankajam
 Kaattumaina (1963)
 Vanambadi (1963) as Chitra
 Panathottam (1963) as Meena
 Paasam (1962) as Chandra

Telugu

 Nene Monaganni (1968) as Neela
 Nenena Managadu
 Vichitra Kutumbam (1969) as Julie
 Bhale Mastaru (1969) as Vimala
 Gowrawam
 Yugandhar

Story, screenplay, and direction
 Yakshagaanam (1976)
 Sikharangal (1979)
 Onnu Chirikkoo (1983) - Story only

Television

Malayalam
Shows as host
 Jeevitham Sakshi (Kairali TV) as presenter
 Sthree (Asianet News) as presenter

Serials
Velutha Kathrina (Kairali TV) as Kathreena
Kanalpoovu (Kairali TV) as Pulikattil Kathreena/Eliyamma
Aliyans (Kaumudy TV) as herself

As judge
Oru chiri oru chiri bumper chiri (Mazhavil Manorama)
Malayali Veetamma (Flowers TV)
Smile Plz (Asianet Plus)
Ugram Ujjwalam (Mazhavil Manorama)
Comedy Stars season 2 (Asianet)
Comedy Festival (Mazhavil Manorama)
Red Carpet (Amrita TV) - Mentor

Other shows
 Flowers Oru Kodi
 Bhava Nayika
 Ningalkkum Aakaam Kodeeshwaran
 JB Junction
 Onnum Onnum Moonnu
 Laughing Villa
 Close Encounter
 Nammude Swantham Karuthammayude Onam
 Badayi Bunglavu
 Comedy Super Nite
 Portrait of an actress
 Nere Chovve 
 Ithihasa Nayikakkoppam
 Cinema Rendezvous 
 Thara Raja Thara Rani
 Lime Light
 Hello Europe
 Star Chat
 Merry Sheela
 Varikalkkidayil
 Puraskara Niravil Nithya Haritha Nayika 
 Media One Online
 Mathrubhumi Online
 Cinema Diary
 DD Interview
 Aashwasaganga
 I Me Myself
 Europe Malayali Journal
 Sheelayude Varthamanam

Tamil
Serials
 Neenivayukale Neengi Vidu (Story, Screenplay, Direction; Doordarshan)
 Aayiram Janmangal starring Rajnikanth (written by Sheela)
 Rusi Kanda Poonai starring Saritha (written by Sheela)
Other Programmes
 Natchathira Sangamam

Theatre
 Kuttavum Shikshyum

References

External links
 Official website
 

1946 births
Living people
J. C. Daniel Award winners
Kerala State Film Award winners
South Indian International Movie Awards winners
Best Supporting Actress National Film Award winners
Filmfare Awards South winners
20th-century Indian actresses
20th-century Indian dramatists and playwrights
20th-century Indian film directors
20th-century Indian women writers
21st-century Indian actresses
Actresses from Thrissur
Actresses in Malayalam cinema
Actresses in Malayalam television
Actresses in Tamil cinema
Actresses in Telugu cinema
Film directors from Thrissur
Indian film actresses
Indian television actresses
Indian women film directors
Indian women screenwriters
Malayalam film directors
Screenwriters from Kerala
Writers from Thrissur